Maxi-Man is the name of two DC Comics heroes. The first was created by Len Wein and Joe Phillips and first appeared in Mister Miracle (vol. 2) #9 (October 1989). The second was created by Jodi Picoult and Drew Johnson and first appeared in Wonder Woman (vol. 3) #6 (May 2007).

Fictional character biography

Henry Hayes
Henry Hayes worked in a successful ad agency. After he was fired, his wife took his young son and left him. Hayes drifted through life until the detonation of an alien gene bomb. He was rushed to the hospital and accidentally given a lethal dose of adrenaline. Instead of dying, Hayes was granted superstrength, superspeed, and superhuman endurance. He decided to become the super-hero Maxi-Man.
	
Maxi-Man was initially unsuccessful, as other heroes regularly out-performed him. He decided to move to the small town of Bailey, New Hampshire, hoping to become the only hero in town. To his dismay, Bailey was also the new home of Mister Miracle II. During the town's first disaster, Mister Miracle saved the day before Maxi-Man could act. Deciding Mister Miracle had to go, Maxi-Man tried to defeat him during their next encounter. Mister Miracle avoided fighting Maxi-Man and made him look foolish. Maxi-Man became more enraged until the crowd intervened. Learning a valuable lesson about heroism, Maxi-Man moved on to work on his skills.

Hayes soon joined Booster Gold's corporate hero team, The Conglomerate. In addition to fighting crime, Maxi-Man and his teammates also became corporate sponsors. Hayes personally appeared in advertisements for Danielle Foods, a lawn care company and division of LexCorp. He participated in the coup of San Sebor. Though the deposed ruler was a tyrant, some of Hayes' teammates protested the nature of the mission. The Justice League attempted to arrest the team after this, but after a tense conversation, they left on uncomfortable terms. 

Thrunctuous, one of The Conglomerate's liaisons, illegally worked with Hector Hammond to create a new superhero with the intention that their creation that would 'accidentally' kill the Conglomerate. Thrunctuous and the superhero, a mindless monster, both died in the resulting fight. The Conglomerate survived the bad publicity, spinning the story such that the public believed they had worked with the Justice League to save the world. But privately, the team decided it was no longer a good idea to participate in their sponsors' often illegal ideas. They opted to become a branch of the Justice League, and Maxi-Man left the team afterwards.

However, Hayes did not retire. He continued adventuring until he was captured by Roulette and forced to battle in her house. He was apparently killed in the "game", and his picture was hung among the other fallen players.

Maxi-Man was often considered old-fashioned by his friends. His speech patterns were decades out of date. Instead of considering the social implications of removing the leader of San Sebor, he declared his love for patriotic superheroes, including General Glory. He later stated his favorite film is Mr. Deeds Goes to Town, a Frank Capra movie.

Maxi-Man successor

A new Maxi-Man appeared briefly in 2007. The second Maxi-Man became a hero after winning a reality TV show; he possesses identical powers to the original. 

When the new Maxi-Man makes a publicity appearance at a theme park, guarded by government agents Nemesis and Diana Prince (Wonder Woman), he is knocked out by debris from a faulty coaster. Nemesis saves him, while Wonder Woman saves the coaster.

DC Comics metahumans
DC Comics superheroes
DC Comics characters with superhuman strength